Rear-Admiral Gerald Cartmell Harrison (8 October 1883 – 10 August 1943) was an English officer of the Royal Navy and a first-class cricketer.

Biography
Harrison was born in Congleton, Cheshire, 
the son of John Harrison, a merchant, and entered the Navy on 15 May 1898, aged 14. He was made a midshipman on 15 December 1899, and promoted to acting sub-lieutenant on 15 December 1902. From 1 April 1913 he commanded , part of the 6th Destroyer Flotilla based at Portsmouth.

Harrison was promoted to commander on 1 January 1918. He married Katherine Robertson on 7 March 1918. He was appointed to command of the Thornycroft type destroyer leader Wallace on 25 January 1919, and on 1 October 1919 was appointed to command of the R-class destroyer Rocket, part of the Portsmouth Local Defence Flotilla.

Harrison was promoted to captain on 31 December 1924. He served as a Deputy Director of Naval Intelligence from April 1930 to April 1932. On 22 September 1933 Harrison was granted permission by the King to wear the insignia of Commander of the Order of the Redeemer that he had been awarded by the President of Greece, in recognition of "valuable services rendered ... on the occasion of the earthquake in Chalcidice". On 4 January 1936 Harrison was promoted to the rank of rear-admiral, and was placed on the Retired List the following day.

Rear-Admiral Harrison died at Spital House, Blyth, Nottinghamshire on 10 August 1943. A memorial plaque was later erected at St Ann's Church, HMNB Portsmouth, and reads:

In Memory of Rear Admiral Gerald Cartmell Harrison
Died 10th August 1943 in his 60th year
His ashes were cast upon the Solent from H.M. Minesweeper 205, 17th Sept 1943
Erected by his wife in loving remembrance.

Cricket

Harrison was a right-handed batsman. He made his county cricket debut for Devon in the 1905 Minor Counties Championship against Cornwall. Harrison played in 27 Minor Counties matches from 1905 to 1910 for the county. Harrison's last appearance for Devon came against Cornwall in the 1910 Minor Counties Championship.

In 1912 Harrison made his first-class debut for Royal Navy against the Army at Lord's. In 1913 Harrison played in the same fixture.

In 1914 Harrison represented Hampshire in the 1914 County Championship, making his debut against Leicestershire. Harrison represented Hampshire eleven times in 1914, before the rest of the season was called off due to the start of the First World War. In the 1914 season Harrison scored 504 runs at an average of 26.52. Harrison made four half centuries, with a high score of 91* against the Marylebone Cricket Club. In 1914 Harrison represented the Navy in a match against the Army.

With the conclusion of the First World War, Harrison returned to Hampshire for the 1919 County Championship, playing his first match for Hampshire that season against Surrey. Harrison played seven matches for Hampshire in 1919, scoring his highest first-class score of 111 against Gloucestershire.

Harrison also played his only first-class match for the Marylebone Cricket Club in 1919, which came against Yorkshire. Three more matches for the Navy (one a Navy and Army team) followed, as well as a single match for the South against the Australian Imperial Forces cricket team.

In 1920 played two matches for the Navy, the last of which came against the Army. During his time representing the Royal Navy, Harrison scored 339 runs at an average of 24.21, which included two half centuries and a high score of 80. 1920 was to also be Harrison's final season with Hampshire, where he played three first-class matches, the last of which came against Leicestershire. In his time with the club Harrison played 22 first-class matches. He scored 991 runs at an average of 28.31, making four half centuries and a single century which yielded his highest score of 111.

References

External links
Gerald Harrison at Cricinfo
Gerald Harrison at CricketArchive
Matches and detailed statistics for Gerald Harrison

1883 births
1943 deaths
People from Congleton
Royal Navy rear admirals
Royal Navy officers of World War I
English cricketers
Devon cricketers
Royal Navy cricketers
Hampshire cricketers
Marylebone Cricket Club cricketers
Combined Services cricketers
Army and Navy cricketers
North v South cricketers
Military personnel from Cheshire